Wendy J. Gordon is an American lawyer who is currently the William Fairfield Warren Distinguished Professor at Boston University School of Law.

References

External links
 Works by Gordon via Google Scholar

Year of birth missing (living people)
Living people
Boston University faculty
American lawyers